The Berdan (also Baradān or Baradā), the ancient Cydnus, is a river in Mersin Province, south Turkey. The historical city of Tarsus is on the river and it is therefore sometimes called the Tarsus River. Originally the watercourse passed directly through the city, but the section in Tarsus was changed to its present course in the 6th century. The river is also the location of Tarsus Waterfall.

Geography 
The main headwaters are in the Toros Mountains. There are two main tributaries: Kadıncık and Pamukluk (its upper reaches are called Cehennem Deresi). Just north of Tarsus there is a waterfall on the river, which is a popular picnic area for Tarsus residents.

Dams 

There are four dams on Berdan. These are used both for controlling floods and for producing electricity. But the lower reaches of the river flow in an agricultural area, and because of the pollution caused by fertilisers the dams in the lower reaches are not used for drinking water.

Trivia 
The Berdan River flows in one of the warmest regions of Turkey, but its upper reaches in the Toros Mountains make the water much cooler than the surrounding streams. History has two very well known accounts of health problems caused by swimming in the river. In 333 BC Alexander the Great and in 833 AD Caliph Al-Ma'mun both swam in the river and both fell ill (hypothermia or pneumonia?); Al Mamun died of the illness.

Cleopatra sailed up the river (older watercourse) and first met Mark Antony aboard her boat.

References 

Rivers of Turkey
Rivers of Mersin Province
Tarsus, Mersin